The Department of Immigration, Local Government and Ethnic Affairs was an Australian government department that existed between July 1987 and March 1993.

Scope
Information about the department's functions and/or government funding allocation could be found in the Administrative Arrangements Orders, the annual Portfolio Budget Statements and in the Department's annual reports.

According to the Administrative Arrangements Order (AAO) made on 24 July 1987, the Department dealt with:
Migration, including refugees
Citizenship and aliens
Ethic affairs
Post-arrival arrangements for migrants, other than migrant child education
Matters relating to local government
Regional development

Structure
The Department was an Australian Public Service department, staffed by officials who were responsible to the Minister for Immigration, Local Government and Ethnic Affairs. The Ministers were Mick Young (until February 1998), then Clyde Holding (from February 1998 until September 1988), then Robert Ray (September 1988 to April 1990 and finally Gerry Hand (April 1990 until March 1993).

From 24 July 1987 to 1 April 1990, the Secretary of the Department was Ron Brown; from 1 April 1990 to 24 March 1993, the Secretary was Chris Conybeare.

References

Ministries established in 1987
Immigration, Local Government and Ethnic Affairs
1987 establishments in Australia
1993 disestablishments in Australia